Lillian Birkenhead (19 January 1905 – 4 February 1979) was a British swimmer. She competed in the women's 100 metre freestyle event at the 1920 Summer Olympics.

References

External links
 

1905 births
1979 deaths
British female swimmers
Olympic swimmers of Great Britain
Swimmers at the 1920 Summer Olympics
Sportspeople from Liverpool
People from Garston
British female freestyle swimmers
20th-century British women